Esther Eggertsen Peterson (December 9, 1906 – December 20, 1997) was an American consumer and women's advocate.

Background
The daughter of Danish immigrants, Esther Eggertsen grew up in a Mormon family in Provo, Utah. She graduated from Brigham Young University in 1927 with a degree in physical education, and a master's from Teachers College, Columbia University, in 1930. She held several teaching positions in the 1930s, including one at the innovative Bryn Mawr Summer School for Women Workers in Industry, which brought milliners, telephone operators and garment workers onto the campus.

She moved to New York City where she married Oliver Peterson. In 1932, the two moved to Boston, where she taught at The Winsor School and volunteered at the YWCA.

Career
In 1938, Peterson became a paid organizer for the American Federation of Teachers and traveled around New England. In 1944, Peterson became the first lobbyist for the National Labor Relations Board in Washington, D.C. In 1948, the State Department offered Peterson's husband a position as a diplomat in Sweden. The family returned to Washington, D.C., in 1957 and Peterson joined the Industrial Union Department of the AFL–CIO, becoming its first woman lobbyist.

She was Assistant Secretary of Labor and Director of the United States Women's Bureau under fellow Bostonian President John F. Kennedy. In 1964, President Lyndon Johnson named Peterson to the newly created post of Special Assistant for Consumer Affairs. She would later serve as President Jimmy Carter's Director of the Office of Consumer Affairs.

Peterson was also Vice President for Consumer Affairs at Giant Food Corporation, and president of the National Consumers League.

She received the Presidential Medal of Freedom in 1981. Peterson was elected to the Common Cause National Governing Board in 1982. In 1990, the American Council on Consumer Interests created the Esther Peterson Consumer Policy Forum lectureship, which is presented annually at the council's conference. She was named a delegate of the United Nations as a UNESCO representative in 1993. In that same year, Peterson was inducted into the National Women's Hall of Fame.

Death
Peterson died on December 20, 1997.

See also
Great Society
Simon P. Eggertsen Sr. House

References

Sources 
 Restless: The Memoirs of Labor and Consumer Activist Esther Peterson (Caring Publishing, 1997)

External links
Archives.gov
Papers, 1884-1998 (inclusive), 1929-1998 (bulk). Schlesinger Library, Radcliffe Institute, Harvard University.
AFL-CIO Profile
Transcribed oral history interview with Esther Peterson at the JFK Library

1906 births
1997 deaths
American feminists
American Latter Day Saints
American people of Danish descent
Brigham Young University alumni
Consumer rights activists
Presidential Medal of Freedom recipients